Aspinwall Lake is a lake in Mahnomen County, in the U.S. state of Minnesota.

Aspinwall Lake was named for Henry Aspinwall, a pioneer who settled on its shores.

See also
List of lakes in Minnesota

References

Lakes of Minnesota
Lakes of Mahnomen County, Minnesota